Manomano or Mano mano may refer to:
 Manomano, a Maori marae in Halcombe, New Zealand
 Manomano, Zimbabwe, a ward in Nkayi, Zimbabwe
 , a French unicorn startup company
 Mano-mano, in Filipino martial arts
 Mano-Mano (Mozambican footballer)

See also 
 Mano a Mano (disambiguation)
 Mah Nà Mah Nà